Alex Julius Kwesigabo (born 19 January 1990), better known by his stage name Flex D'Paper, is a Ugandan rapper and songwriter born and raised in Kampala.
Starting off his music career, Flex D'Paper was part of the high school rap group, The Rapaholix, which he started with friends, Dasper Cosine and later joined by Apass as an affiliate with whom the trio put out a mix tape, The Eviction Notice that included chart topping singles like "Burning", "Party Life" and "Follow Me" (with Allan Toniks) which topped countdowns in Uganda such as NTV and Sanyu FM.  Flex D'Paper was part of the 2014 UG Cypher including the finest Ugandan rappers: Navio, Keko, Big Tril, Don MC, AirporTaxi rappers (Tucker and LLyboc) St. Nelly Sade, GNL Zamba, DJ Global, JB, The Mith, Ruyonga, and Atlas.

Early life and education
Flex D’Paper was born on 19 January 1990 in Kampala. He comes from a family of eight children. He studied his primary school from Greenhill Academy and his secondary school from Seeta High School for Ordinary Level and St. Mary's Kitende for Advanced level. He later enrolled to Makerere University for a degree in Information Technology.

Career

2012–2016: Eviction Notice Mixtape and other recordings
During an interview with Hot 100.9 fm in Uganda, Flex D'Paper explained how he got his name from being flexible because of the different styles of music that he can write as well as ghostwrite for other artists, while Paper comes from being motivated to get the money, and change his environment for the better. 
It's on the same interview that he says, he gets his influence from Jay Z, BIG, Nas and more.
Together with the group, they performed at many High school occasions and later went ahead to release a joint mixtape in 2013, with Ugandan chart topping singles like "Shutting Down Towns" featuring Martha Smallz produced by Aethan, a top hip hop producer in Uganda. and "Follow Me" featuring Allan Toniks.
In 2013, Flex D’Paper went ahead to do solo music, and followed it up with the hit "More" featuring Kemishan. Produced by Baru. He put out only one single as he completed work on his yet to be released album, The Kampala Boy.

In 2014, he released the single "Leader" with Sheila  which premiered on Bryan Mckenzie's Weekly top twenty countdown, on Radiocity. a popular radio and TV personality in Uganda. It was also played and featured on Mister Deejay's SNMS show, another popular radio personality in Uganda.
Flex D'Paper released the video to "Leader" in 2015, a song that went ahead to make it to most countdowns in Uganda and East Africa as well.

In 2015, Flex D'Paper was invited by the United States Embassy in Kampala, Uganda to rap and perform alongside the Next Level group while in Kampala, An initiative of the US State Dept & UNC Music Department to send artists around the world to use hip-hop as a tool for cultural diplomacy & conflict resolution.
He has shared a stage and performed alongside artists like Navio, Maro, Megaloh, Ghanaian Stallion GNL Zamba, Allan Toniks, Keko, Chameleone Bebe Cool, Octopizzo from Kenya  Radio & Weasel among others and opened for international act, Ne-Yo.
In 2015, Flex D'Paper was once again among the top rappers/ emcees to be featured on the official Ugandan rap cypher (Ug Cypher 2) that included Navio, the mith, Ruyonga, and St. Nelly-Sade among others.
In 2016, Flex D'Paper put out a Ugandan remix to popular Kenyan song Ting Badi Malo, originally performed by Khaligraph Jones  and later Day Ones, featuring Navio and Martha Smallz. The song made it to number one on the biggest Urban radios in Uganda, like Sanyu Fm and Radiocity's Top Twenty Countdown. and later was listed among the top Hip Hop songs from Uganda for 2016, by Tribe.Ug.

In October 2016, Flex D'Paper after releasing a compilation CD, with the different freestyles and singles he set off for a city tour in Europe performing at festivals and clubs starting with Stuttgart, Frankfurt and Berlin in Germany and later Brussels.

MTV Base in November 2016, named Flex among the top MCs from Uganda on the Base Top MCs Uganda list 2016.

2017: Not For Sale mixtape release and other recordings

In 2017, he went on to put out his first solo mixtape Not For Sale (mixtape) in June, that featured the chart topping single Yenze Aliko produced by Mio Made.
The mixtape also includes Never Give Up a collaboration recorded with Germany rapper, Mako Loco.

Day Ones featuring Navio and Martha Smallz, a single off the mixtape was nominated for The Buzz Teeniez Awards for Hip Hop Song of the year.
The remix to the song was later put out featuring Mako Loco and P Bane both rappers from Germany.

On 16 October 2017, the Mixtape release party was held at the Uganda Germany Cultural Center a platform he used to introduce other various artists to show case as well.

In the Ug Hip Hop Awards 2017, the mixtape won Mixtape Of The Year award

2019 
Yenze Aliko, a single by Flex won the song of the year award at MTN UG Hip Hop awards On 8 February 2019 at the annual MTN Ug HipHop awards, Flex D'Paper's single Yenze Aliko was announced as the Song Of The Year. The awards are sponsored by MTN Uganda a leading telecom company in Uganda.

In 2020, he launched the  "Eno Hip Hop" festival, an event planned to happen annually celebrating Hip Hop.
The festival that had performers from Uganda, Kenya and DRC happened in December as a two-day event.

2021 - present

Flex released his debut album, the Kampala Boy on 10 December 2021.
The album debuted at Number 4 on its first day on the Apple iTunes charts All genres category in Uganda, with singles in the Top 100 on the charts too.

Discography

Singles

Mixtapes

Not for Sale mixtape by Flex D'Paper

Albums
Kampala Boy

Awards and nominations

Rapaholix clothing line

In 2012, Flex D'Paper created his own clothing line, The Rapholix Wear.
The brand has gained popularity over time especially among the youth and different public figures.

Endorsements and Campaigns 
One Million Campaign Against Cancer (1MC)

In 2015, Flex D'Paper together with other artists, Keko, Daisy Ejang, Nava Grey, comedian Pablo among others joined the One Million Campaign Against Cancer, a campaign by Uganda Child Cancer Foundation aimed at supporting children and young persons suffering from cancer in Uganda.

Ambition Mission

In 2015, Flex D'Paper was also among the young artists and public figures that represented the Ambition Mission.
Some of the artists include Juliana Kanyomozi, Eddy Kenzo, Mun G among others.
The non-government organization was behind campaigns like "I Am Ambition Mission, Sili Taaba", an anti-tobacco campaign.
Viva con Agua de Sankt Pauli
In March 2016, Flex D'Paper was part of the artists in Uganda that joined Viva con Agua de Sankt Pauli a charity based organisation located in St. Pauli/Hamburg campaigning for fresh water, sanitation and hygiene (WASH).
The organization held a concert where the artists including Flex D'Paper performed alongside some international acts like Octopizzo from Kenya, Ghanaian Stallion, Lady Slyke, Sylvester & Abramz among others.
In 2017, at the World Water Day celebrations held in Moroto Uganda, he performed alongside other ambassadorsm keko, The Mith and Maro.
He later performed on the We Love Youganda festival held on 2 December organized by Viva con Agua de Sankt Pauli Kampala office alongside various artists like Maro, Navio, Muthoni from Rwanda and more including Chef Boss from Germany.

In 2018, he was among the headliners for the WE LOVE YOUGANDA concert 2019 held at the square on 17 November 2018. The show included performances from Ugandan artists as well as top German rapper Samy Deluxe.

References

External links
 

1990 births
Living people
People from Kampala
Ugandan rappers
21st-century Ugandan male singers